Peter Paillou (1757–1831 or 1832), was a British painter of portraits including miniatures.

Life and work

Paillou was the son of a natural history painter and illustrator also named Peter Paillou, who is believed to have been born in France before migrating to England.

He practised in London for 20 years before moving to Glasgow for some years, where an 1803 advertisement states that he charged eight guineas for a miniature and ten guineas for a three quarter length portrait in oils.

Works in national collections
 National Portrait Gallery (Mary, Queen of Scots; Ralph Wardlaw)
 Victoria and Albert Museum (William Rowley, miniatures)
 Art UK (Ann Ruthven Leven Bell, Robert Findlay)
 Fitzwilliam Museum (Susannah Wedgwood, the mother of Charles Darwin)

References

1757 births
1831 deaths
18th-century English painters
English male painters
19th-century English painters
English portrait painters
Scottish portrait painters
Miniature painting
19th-century English male artists
18th-century English male artists